XHTGU-FM is a radio station on 93.9 FM in Tuxtla Gutiérrez, Chiapas, Mexico. It is the flagship of the state-owned Radio Chiapas state network and is known as Radio Chiapas.

History
XHTGU came to air on September 15, 1994. It began broadcasting under the name of Stereo 94 and in 2002 it was named La Radio de Todos. From 2007 to 2020, it was known as Vida FM.

References

Radio stations in Chiapas
Public radio in Mexico